The 1986 World Junior Championships in Athletics was the inaugural 1986 edition of the World Junior Championships in Athletics. It was held in Athens, Greece on 16–20 July.

Results

Men

Women

Medal table

Participation
According to an unofficial count through an unofficial result list, 1135 athletes from 142 countries participated in the event.  This is in agreement with the official numbers as published.

See also
1986 in athletics (track and field)

References

External links
Medalists at GBRathletics.com
Results
Official results

 
1986
W
World Junior Championships in Athletics
Sports competitions in Athens
International athletics competitions hosted by Greece
20th century in Athens